Andrew Mitchell Billings (born March 6, 1995) is an American football defensive tackle for the Chicago Bears of the National Football League (NFL). He played college football at Baylor and was drafted by the Cincinnati Bengals in the fourth round of the 2016 NFL Draft.

Early years
Billings attended Waco High School in Waco, Texas. He was rated by Rivals.com as a four-star recruit and committed to Baylor University to play college football. Billings also competed in powerlifting during high school and broke Mark Henry's Texas record with 2,010 pounds. The record was set with an 805-pound squat, 500 pound bench press, and a 705-pound dead lift.

College career
As a true freshman at Baylor in 2013, Billings played in 11 games and made two starts while recording 29 total tackles. As a sophomore in 2014, he started all 13 games and was named All-Big 12 after recording 37 tackles and two sacks.

Professional career

NFL Combine
As a top defensive tackle prospect, Billings received an invitation to the NFL Combine. He attended the combine and completed all of the required combine drills. Fox Sports listed him as one of their top five biggest winners from the combine and his performance was perceived well overall by scouts for his display of raw strength coupled with exceptional quickness and speed for a man of his size. On March 16, 2016, Billings participated at Baylor's Pro Day along with Corey Coleman, Shawn Oakman, Spencer Drango, Xavien Howard, Grant Campbell, LaQuan McGowan, Jimmy Landes, and seven other teammates. A record 61 team representatives and scouts from all 32 NFL teams attended Baylor's pro day, including general manager Kevin Colbert (Steelers) and head coaches Mike Tomlin (Steelers) and Bill O'Brien (Texans). Billings performed well and chose to run the 40-yard dash (4.96), 20-yard dash (2.89), 10-yard dash (1.76), short shuttle (4.78), and three-cone drill (7.74) and decreased his times from the combine in all of them. At the conclusion of the pre-draft process, Billings was projected to be a late-first or second round pick. He was ranked the third best defensive tackle prospect in the draft by ESPN, the sixth best defensive tackle by NFLDraftScout.com and NFL analyst Mike Mayock, and was ranked the seventh best defensive lineman by Sports Illustrated He drew major interest and was linked to the Green Bay Packers, Washington Redskins, Pittsburgh Steelers, and Minnesota Vikings.

Cincinnati Bengals
The Cincinnati Bengals selected Billings in the fourth round (122nd overall) of the 2016 NFL Draft. He was the 16th defensive tackle selected in 2016. His fall in the draft was greatly unexpected as no teams gave any indications of it prior to the draft. He was projected as a first rounder in multiple mock drafts by Pro Football Focus and NFL analysts Todd McShay and Mel Kiper Jr. There were many speculations that ranged from his lack of height and size for his position and a possible knee injury. Bengals' head coach Marvin Lewis said "I think his height maybe was restrictive in some ways for some people at times but we've done pretty well these guys.". Billings stated in regards to his fall in the draft, "This is something I'm going to carry with me my whole life," Billings said. "It's actually a good thing for me." He drew comparisons, by multiple media outlets, to teammate Geno Atkins and his equally unexpected slide in the draft during the 2010 NFL Draft.

2016
On May 18, 2016, the Bengals signed Billings to a four-year, $2.87 million contract that included a signing bonus of $535,845.

He competed with Domata Peko, Pat Sims, and DeShawn Williams throughout training camp for the starting nose tackle position. On August 10, 2016, he was carted off the field during the Bengals' practice after suffering a knee injury. On August 15, he underwent surgery to repair a torn meniscus and was placed on injured reserve for the entirety of the season. The Cincinnati Bengals later lost another rookie (William Jackson III) for the entire .

2017
Billings competed with Pat Sims, DeShawn Williams, and Josh Tupou throughout training camp for the vacant starting nose tackle position left by the departure of Domata Peko to the Denver Broncos during free agency. Head coach Marvin Lewis named him the backup nose tackle to Pat Sims to begin the regular season.

He made his professional regular season debut in the Cincinnati Bengals' season-opener against the Baltimore Ravens and recorded one solo tackle in their 20–0 loss. On November 24, 2017, Billings earned his first career start against the Tennessee Titans in place of Sims who had injured his calf the previous week. Billings recorded a season-high four combined tackles in the Bengals' 24–20 loss. Throughout the first seven games he played in 59 total defensive snaps and earned 48 defensive snaps against the Titans.

Cleveland Browns

On March 26, 2020, Billings signed with the Cleveland Browns. He chose to opt-out of the 2020 season due to the COVID-19 pandemic on August 4, 2020.

Billings was waived by the Browns on November 13, 2021.

Miami Dolphins
On November 16, 2021, Billings was signed to the Miami Dolphins practice squad.

Kansas City Chiefs
On January 19, 2022, Billings was signed to the Kansas City Chiefs practice squad.

Las Vegas Raiders
On February 27, 2022, Billings signed with the Las Vegas Raiders.

Chicago Bears
On March 16, 2023, Billings signed with the Chicago Bears.

Career statistics

References

External links
Baylor Bears bio
Cincinnati Bengals bio

1995 births
Living people
Waco High School alumni
Sportspeople from Waco, Texas
Players of American football from Texas
American football defensive tackles
Baylor Bears football players
Cincinnati Bengals players
Cleveland Browns players
Miami Dolphins players
Kansas City Chiefs players
Las Vegas Raiders players
Chicago Bears players